Azzimuddin is a citizen of Afghanistan who was held in extrajudicial detention in the United States Bagram Theater Internment Facility, in Afghanistan.
He was released on May 15, 2010, after approximately three months of detention.
Ten other Afghans were released at the same time as he was.  The Miami Herald described their release as a symbolic gesture.

According to the Miami Herald, he told reporters he spent his first two weeks in Bagram's secret "black prison".
He told reporters he spent a further three months in the main Bagram prison, where he underwent daily interrogations.
He told reporters his interrogators believed he had helped arm the Taliban, but that they eventually concluded he was innocent.

According to the Miami Herald Captain Jack Hanzlik, a military spokesman, disputed that the USA was operating any secret prisons.

On January 15, 2010, the Department of Defense complied with a court order and published a list of Detainees held in the Bagram Theater Internment Facility.
There were 645 names on the list, which was dated September 22, 2009, and was heavily redacted.
Azzimuddin's name isn't on that list.

References

Bagram Theater Internment Facility detainees
Living people
1972 births
Date of birth missing (living people)